Causeland railway station is an intermediate station  south of  on the scenic Looe Valley Line in Cornwall, United Kingdom, which serves the hamlet of Causeland.

History
The Liskeard and Looe Railway was opened on 27 December 1860 to carry goods traffic; passenger trains started on 11 September 1879.

Causeland was reopened in June 1888.

Facilities 
Very few facilities are provided at Causeland, consisting of a simple waiting shelter, an information board and a payphone.

Services
All trains on the Liskeard to Looe "Looe Valley Line" stop at Causeland on request: passengers alighting here must tell the conductor that they wish to do so, and those waiting to join must signal clearly to the driver as the train approaches. There is no Sunday service in the winter.

Community rail
The railway between Liskeard and Looe is designated as a community rail line and is supported by marketing provided by the Devon and Cornwall Rail Partnership. The line is promoted under the "Looe Valley Line" name. "Ye Old Plough House Inn" at Duloe is included in the Looe Valley Line rail ale trail although it is a 30-minute walk away.

Cultural References 
Causeland is one of the stations named in Bernard Moore's poem Travelling.

References

 
 
 
 
 
 
 

Railway stations in Cornwall
Former Liskeard and Looe Railway stations
Railway stations in Great Britain opened in 1879
Railway stations served by Great Western Railway
Railway request stops in Great Britain
DfT Category F2 stations